The Prison de l’Abbaye was a Paris prison in use from 1522 to 1854. The final building was built by Christophe Gamard in 1631 and made up of three floors, flanked by two turrets (or more exactly, échauguettes). It was the scene of a portion of the September Massacres, one of the bloodiest episodes of the French Revolution. Twenty-two priests were given summary trials and then killed by mob outside the church.  

Madame Roland, wife of the Girondin Minister of the Interior Jean-Marie Roland, was interned here on her first arrest in 1793 before being transferred to Sainte Pélagie.

History

Pre-Revolution 

It occupied part of the current site of Boulevard Saint-Germain in the SE corner of the enclosure of the Abbey of Saint-Germain-des-Prés. The abbey dated to the earliest era of Paris, when Childebert I (on the site of a temple to Isis or Ceres, according to legend) founded a monastery dedicated to the Holy Cross and to St Vincent of Saragossa, which later took the name of its administering bishop Germain of Paris. Its basilica became known as "Saint-Denis of the Merovingians", since it contained the tombs of Childebert I and others of the dynasty.

Massacres

Destruction 
The prison de l’Abbaye was later transformed into a military prison and was finally demolished in 1854 for the construction of boulevard Saint-Germain.

References

Bibliography
 Favier, Jean; et al., editors (1988). Chronique de la Révolution. Paris: Larousse; Éditions Jacques Legrand. .

Abbaye
French Revolution
Buildings and structures demolished in 1854